Jeff Jason Reine-Adélaïde (born 17 January 1998) is a French professional footballer who plays as a midfielder for Ligue 1 club Troyes, on loan from Lyon.

Club career

Arsenal

Born in Champigny-sur-Marne, Reine-Adélaïde started his career with RC Lens where he played for the club's youth and reserve sides. He made his first-team debut for Racing Club as an unused substitute on 18 April 2015 against Metz. Lens lost the match 3–1. After the season, Reine-Adélaïde signed for Arsenal of the Premier League in England. He made his start for the 2015–16 season in the Emirates Cup against Lyon in which his performance was praised by supporters and pundits.

He made his professional debut for Arsenal on 9 January 2016 against Sunderland in the FA Cup, coming on as an 81st-minute substitute for Joel Campbell in a 3–1 win at the Emirates Stadium.

Reine-Adélaïde played for Arsenal in their victorious U21 Premier League's play off final of 2016. Also held at the Emirates Stadium, this win thus earned the Gooners promotion to the U21 league's first division.

Adélaïde made six appearances for the club's first team during the 2016–17 season, with the last of those caps coming in Arsenal's FA Cup quarter-final win against Sutton United. After he featured against Reading for Arsenal's U23s, Adélaïde picked up an injury which thus sidelined him for the rest of the season.

Angers
Adélaïde joined French Ligue 1 side Angers on loan for the rest of the 2017–18 season on 31 January 2018. He made his Angers debut as a sub in a 4–0 loss to Monaco on 10 February 2018. He returned to Arsenal at the end of his loan on 1 July 2018. On 26 July 2018, Angers signed him from Arsenal for an undisclosed fee on a four year contract. He wore jersey number 22 for the 2018-19 season.

Lyon
After a strong season debut match in which Reine-Adélaïde scored a goal and provided an assist, Olympique Lyonnais announced on 14 August 2019 that they had signed the player on a five-year contract from Angers SCO for €25 million, with an additional €2.5 million in bonuses.

On 5 October 2020, Reine-Adélaïde joined Nice in a season-long loan with a €25 million option to buy. However, the club opted not to make the move permanent, with Reine-Adélaïde having been injured for a large part of the season.

On 30 January 2023, Reine-Adélaïde signed for Ligue 1 club Troyes on loan until the end of the season.

Career statistics

Honours
Arsenal
FA Cup: 2016–17

Arsenal Youth
U21 Premier League play-off final: 2016

France
UEFA European Under-17 Championship: 2015

Individual
UNFP Ligue 1 Player of the Month: November 2019
UEFA European Under-17 Championship Team of the Tournament: 2015

References

External links

Profile at the Arsenal F.C. website

1998 births
Living people
People from Champigny-sur-Marne
Footballers from Val-de-Marne
French footballers
Association football midfielders
US Torcy players
RC Lens players
Arsenal F.C. players
Angers SCO players
Olympique Lyonnais players
OGC Nice players
ES Troyes AC players
Ligue 1 players
France youth international footballers
France under-21 international footballers
French expatriate footballers
Expatriate footballers in England
French expatriate sportspeople in England
Black French sportspeople